Russell Shields (born 22 July 1962) is a former Australian rules footballer who played for Hawthorn in the Victorian Football League. He was recruited from Frankston Peninsula.

After playing 17 games over two years at Hawthorn, he moved to South Australia to play for Central District in the South Australian National Football League.  He returned to Victoria in 1988 to play for Footscray, where he kicked 5 goals in round 1, his first game for the Bulldogs.

References

External links

1962 births
Australian rules footballers from Victoria (Australia)
Hawthorn Football Club players
Western Bulldogs players
Central District Football Club players
Living people